Yumkhaibam Jiteshwor Singh (born 10 December 2001) is an Indian professional footballer who plays as a midfielder for Chennaiyin in the Indian Super League.

Club career

NEROCA 
In July 2019, Jiteshwor joined NEROCA ahead of the upcoming I-League season. On 8 January 2020, he made his professional debut for the club in the 7th matchweek of the 2019–20 I-League campaign against TRAU, in a 2–1 loss. On 11 July 2021, Jiteshwor extended his contract with NEROCA for the 2021–22 season.

Chennaiyin 
In June 2022, Indian Super League club Chennaiyin roped in Jiteshwor on a two-year deal. On 20 August, he made his debut against Army Red in the Durand Cup, which ended in a 2–2 draw. On 14 October, he was awarded the Hero of the Match for his impressive performance against Bengaluru in the Indian Super League, which ended in a 1–1 stalemate.

Career statistics

Club

References

2001 births
Living people
Indian footballers
Association football midfielders
NEROCA FC players
Bhawanipore FC players